Mamonovka is a rural locality (a selo) and the administrative center of Mamonovskoye Rural Settlement, Verkhnemamonsky District, Voronezh Oblast, Russia. The population was 631 as of 2010. There are 10 streets.

Geography 
Mamonovka is located 33 km north of Verkhny Mamon (the district's administrative centre) by road. Russkaya Zhuravka is the nearest rural locality.

References 

Rural localities in Verkhnemamonsky District